Dichomeris moriutii is a moth in the family Gelechiidae. It was described by Ponomarenko and Ueda in 2004. It is found in China (Hong Kong, Gansu, Guangxi, Guizhou, Hunan, Zhejiang) and Thailand.

The wingspan is 10.5–16 mm. The forewings are greyish yellow with scattered dark brown scales. The pattern of the forewings is formed by eight short oblique dark brown costal marks and a distinct dark brown dot near the middle of the cell and a small concolorous dot at the middle of the anal fold, as well as a large dark brown spot along the termen and outer margin. The hindwings are greyish brown.

Etymology
The species is named for Professor S. Moriuti, who studied microlepidoptera and collected moths during expeditions to Thailand.

References

Moths described in 2004
moriutii